Isaac Beattie Ross (born 27 October 1984) is a New Zealand rugby union player. He plays in the lock position for the San Diego Legion of Major League Rugby (MLR) competition in the U.S.

Professional career
Ross is of Māori descent, and played for New Zealand Māori between 2007 and 2010. He affiliates to Ngāti Kahungunu.

Ross followed in the footsteps of his father Jock when he pulled on an All Black jersey for the first time in 2009. In as cover for the injured Ali Williams, Ross impressed with an athletic performance in an otherwise sloppy loss to France in Dunedin. Despite fears that Ross neglected the grittier aspects of lock play, continuing injury to Williams ensured that he began the Tri-Nations in the All Black second row. He won his fourth cap against Australia in the opening game of the series, helping his side to a 22–16 win.

At domestic level Ross represented Canterbury, and has played for the Chiefs, Crusaders and Highlanders at Super Rugby level since his debut in 2007. Following the conclusion of the Tri Nations in 2009 Ross was omitted from the All Blacks November tour squad, being told to bulk up in order to reclaim his place. He failed to do so following the 2010 Super 14, and returned to the Canterbury ranks as the All Blacks romped away with the Tri Nations.

Early life
Isaac Ross's talent was obvious from an early age and after starring in the Timaru Boys' High School top side, he played for the national secondary schools and age group sides before having the first of his 53 games for Canterbury in 2006.

Ross had an exceptional rugby pedigree. His father, Jock, a stalwart of Mid Canterbury, for whom he played more than 100 games, and also a lock and lineout expert, was an All Black tourist to France and Romania in 1981, while his mother, Christine, played for the Black Ferns.

Super Rugby
He played for the Crusaders for the first time in 2007, but in 2008, with Ali Williams joining the franchise for a year to partner Brad Thorn, he went into the draft and was picked up by the Highlanders. He returned to the Crusaders in 2009, where he appeared in all 14 matches, gained him promotion to the All Blacks. In the 2010 season with the Crusaders the presence of Thorn, the return of Chris Jack from overseas and the rise of the young Sam Whitelock meant he received only five matches in the Super 15 competition. On 27 September 2010, the Chiefs announced that they signed Isaac Ross for the 2011 Super Rugby season. He played 11 games and brought his Super Rugby appearances to 43, but again without looking as if he would regain his place in the national pecking order. He then departed for a contract with the NTT Communications Shining Arcs of the Japanese Top League.

All Blacks
On 22 May 2009, Ross was selected for the Iveco Series 26 man All Black squad. He made his debut against France on 13 June, where he partnered his Crusaders teammate, Brad Thorn. He scored his first try against Italy in the All Blacks 27–6 win over the side on 27 June 2009.

Outside rugby
In 2010, Ross and winner of the 2009 Forestry Modern Apprentice of the Year awards, Warren Ropiha, became the faces of Jigsaw Family Services Extra Ordinary Dads campaign; celebrating fathers and the important role they play in their children's lives. They joined the 2009 representatives Cory Jane and Mike McRoberts. Jigsaw Family Services is a network of 39 organisations in New Zealand working to stop child abuse, neglect and family violence in New Zealand communities. The Extra Ordinary Dads campaign aims to spark conversations about what makes a good father as dads share stories about taking the time to play with, listen to and encourage their kids, and to create strong positive family relationships. Ross also works as a sports interviewer on The Erin Simpson Show. His favorite television programme is Law & Order.

References

External links
 
Jigsaw extra ordinary dad interview

1984 births
Living people
New Zealand rugby union players
Rugby union players from Ashburton, New Zealand
New Zealand international rugby union players
Māori All Blacks players
People educated at Timaru Boys' High School
Urayasu D-Rocks players
Canterbury rugby union players
Crusaders (rugby union) players
Chiefs (rugby union) players
Highlanders (rugby union) players
New Zealand expatriate rugby union players
Expatriate rugby union players in Japan
New Zealand expatriate sportspeople in Japan
Rugby union locks
Tasman rugby union players
Austin Gilgronis players
Ngāti Kahungunu people
San Diego Legion players